Mexico–Yugoslavia relations were historical foreign relations between Mexico and now split-up Socialist Federal Republic of Yugoslavia. Mexico and Yugoslavia established diplomatic relations on 24 May 1946 on the initiative of the President of Yugoslavia Josip Broz Tito. Both countries shared their views on Francoist Spain and cooperated with the Spanish Republican government in exile. On 31 July 1952 the two countries protested strongly against a decision of a United Nations committee to ask the Franco Government what it might be able to do to strengthen the collective security.

Breakup of Yugoslavia
In the initial aftermath of the breakup of Yugoslavia Mexico maintained its diplomatic relations with newly established Federal Republic of Yugoslavia (Serbia and Montenegro) but reduced its level to the charge d'affaires due to host country involvement in Bosnian War. Following the United Nations Security Council Resolution 757 Mexico refused the entry of any Yugoslav official and banned its government officials from traveling to Federal Republic of Yugoslavia. Mexico however maintained its embassy in Belgrade and established formal relations with Serbia and Montenegro and other successor states.

List of bilateral state visits

Yugoslav visits to Mexico
 October 1963: Josip Broz Tito
 March 1976: Josip Broz Tito
 October 1981: Lazar Mojsov

Mexican visits to Yugoslavia
 March 1963: Adolfo López Mateos
 February 1974: Luis Echeverría Álvarez
 January 1985: Miguel de la Madrid Hurtado

See also
Yu-Mex
Yugoslavia and the Non-Aligned Movement
Yugoslavia at the 1968 Summer Olympics
Mexico at the 1984 Winter Olympics
Death and state funeral of Josip Broz Tito
Croatia–Mexico relations
Mexico–Serbia relations
Mexico–Slovenia relations
Yugoslav volunteers in the Spanish Civil War

References

External links
Yu-Mex: Yugoslav Mexican Music of the 1950s
(In Spanish) El profundo amor de la antigua Yugoslavia por México

Mexico–Yugoslavia relations
Mexico
Yugoslavia
Bosnia and Herzegovina–Mexico relations
Mexico–North Macedonia relations
Mexico–Serbia relations
Mexico–Slovenia relations